Claudia Rodríguez Abella (born 2 May 1995) is a Venezuelan footballer who plays as a defender for Spanish Primera Nacional club CD Parquesol and the Venezuela women's national team. She also holds Spanish citizenship.

International career
Rodríguez represented Venezuela at the 2014 South American U-20 Women's Championship. At senior level, she played the 2014 Copa América Femenina.

References

1995 births
Living people
Women's association football defenders
Venezuelan women's footballers
People from Miranda (state)
Venezuelan people of Spanish descent
Venezuela women's international footballers
Deportivo La Guaira players
EdF Logroño players
Venezuelan expatriate women's footballers
Venezuelan expatriate sportspeople in Spain
Expatriate women's footballers in Spain